EGOT is an acronym for "Emmy, Grammy, Oscar, Tony" in reference to persons who have won all four awards.

EGOT may also refer to:

 EGOT (gene), the Eosinophil Granule  Ontogeny Transcript non-protein coding gene which encodes a long noncoding RNA molecule
 EGOT, the enzyme Erythrocyte Glutamic Oxaloacetic Transferase
 EGOT, the enzyme Erythrocyte Glutamate Oxaloacetate Transaminase